Tomás Ó Flatharta is a Gaelic football manager who is originally from County Kerry. He has managed three county teams: Westmeath, Galway and Laois.

Playing career
Durling his playing days, Ó Flatharta played for his local An Ghaeltacht club and, later, for Dublin GAA club Kilmacud Crokes, with whom he was a member of the 1995 All-Ireland Senior Club Football Championship winning side.

Managerial career

Westmeath
Ó Flatharta managed Westmeath from 2005 to 2009 where he succeeded Kerry's Páidí Ó Sé. Ó Flatharta resigned as manager in July 2009 after Westmeath were beaten in the qualifiers by neighbours Meath.

When appointed as Westmeath manager Ó Flatharta was a banker based in Dublin and had been team trainer and selector during the previous two years.

Galway
In October 2010, Ó Flatharta was confirmed as the new Galway manager to succeed former Armagh player Joe Kernan, who resigned early in the summer after a poor season.
In August 2011 the Galway County Board decided to relieve him of his post after Galway had been relegated to Div 2 of the National Football League and failed to win a championship match.

Laois
Following the departure of Justin McNulty, Ó Flatharta was drafted in as favourite for the vacant Laois job.
In October 2013, Ó Flatharta was confirmed as Laois manager to replace McNulty. He stepped down as manager in July 2015 following their shocking exit against Antrim.

Honours
Westmeath manager
National League 2: 2006, 2008

References

Year of birth missing (living people)
Living people
An Ghaeltacht Gaelic footballers
Gaelic football managers
Gaelic football selectors
Irish bankers
Kilmacud Crokes Gaelic footballers
21st-century Irish people